Todor Zaytsev (born 30 May 1967) is a former Bulgarian footballer who played as a midfielder.

Career
Zaytsev's career is mostly associated with Botev Plovdiv, though he also donned the shirt of city rivals 
Lokomotiv Plovdiv as well as Levski Sofia (becoming vice-champion of Bulgaria with the "bluemen") and Chernomorets Burgas. Between 1998 and 2000, he had a spell in Malta.

References

External links
Player Profile at levskisofia.info

1967 births
Living people
Bulgarian footballers
Botev Plovdiv players
PFC Lokomotiv Plovdiv players
PFC Levski Sofia players
Floriana F.C. players
FC Chernomorets Burgas players
First Professional Football League (Bulgaria) players
Expatriate footballers in Malta
Bulgarian expatriate footballers
Association football midfielders
Footballers from Plovdiv